Saint Brynach was a 6th-century Welsh saint. He is traditionally associated with Pembrokeshire, where several churches are dedicated to him.

Life

A 12th-century account of Brynach's life states that sometime in the early 6th century, Brynach travelled (from where is unstated) to Rome and Brittany, and then on to Milford Haven. He erected various oratories near the rivers Cleddau, Gwaun, and Caman and at the foot of Mynydd Carningli (translated as 'Mountain of the Angels'), which was his most famous foundation. This monastery founded by Brynach was at present-day Nevern (in Welsh, Nanhyfer). The land was given to him by the local lord, Clether, who retired to Cornwall. Brynach was harassed by King Maelgwn of Gwynedd for a while, until he wrought miracles and the two came to terms. Saint Brynach died on 7 April, on which day his feast is celebrated. His church, beside the River Nevern, is his lasting memorial.

The "Life of St Brynach" portrays him as something of a wild fellow in his youth but very virtuous after his conversion.  The descriptions of his adventures (including amorous and ghostly encounters) display a degree of humour unusual in the writers of saintly lives.

Problems of identification

Brynach may be a form of the Irish name, Bernach. This possibly etymology has led to speculation that Saint Brynach came from Ireland: Iolo Morganwg, followed by Baring-Gould, supposed that he is the same as the chieftain 'Fernach' who came to Wales from Ireland with the young Brychan of Brycheiniog. However, Egerton Phillimore rejects this identification A 'Brennach Wyddel o'r Gogledd' or Brennach the Irishman of the North [of Britain] appears in the Welsh Triads: Rachel Bromwich does not believe Saint Brynach is meant.

Dedications

Dedications of churches to Brynach in Pembrokeshire include Nevern, Dinas Cross, Llanfyrnach, Henry's Moat and Pontfaen. In Carmarthenshire there are Llanboidy and a chapel in Llanddarog, and there are scattered dedications in Glamorgan, Brecknockshire and Monmouthshire.  The distribution of these is similar to that of Ogham stones in south Wales, and defines a distinct Irish-influenced province that existed in the Age of the Saints in the History of Wales.

Notes

References
 Baring-Gould, Sabine & Fisher, John (1907). Lives of the British Saints
 Bromwich. Rachel (2006) Trioedd Ynys Prydein: The Triads of the Island of Britain, 3rd ed.
 Phillimore. Egerton (1906) Notes in: George Owen's "The Description of Pembrokeshire" (1603).

Year of birth missing
Year of death missing
Brannoc
Medieval Welsh saints
6th-century Christian saints